Kendriya Vidyalaya, BEML Nagar is a school located in the Kolar Gold Fields, Karnataka, India. It was established in 1982 and is affiliated to the CBSE board, New Delhi.

It is a school of the chain of KVS, an autonomous body under the Ministry of HRD, government of India. The Kendriya Vidyalayas are situated in all the states of India and in Kathmandu, Iran and Moscow.

The school started functioning in 1982 under the project sector, catering to the needs of the children of the employees of BEML, Government of India undertaking under the Ministry of Defence.

The Vidyalaya has an imposing building with gardens and a children’s park, nestling amidst the greenery.

External links

Kendriya Vidyalayas in Karnataka
Schools in Kolar district
Educational institutions established in 1982